John Robinson (born October 25, 1985) is an American actor. He portrayed John McFarland in Gus Van Sant's Elephant and Stacy Peralta in the skateboarding film Lords of Dogtown.

Robinson enjoys snowboarding and played lacrosse in high school. He has also done some modeling. He is a 2005 graduate of the Oregon Episcopal School. Robinson gave an in-depth interview in issue 10 of Hero, published in October 2013.

Filmography

Film

References

External links

1985 births
American male film actors
Living people
Male actors from Portland, Oregon
Male models from Oregon
Oregon Episcopal School alumni